The gens Carisia was a Roman family during the latter half of the 1st century BC  The most famous member of the gens was Titus Carisius, who defeated the Astures in Hispania, and took their chief town, Lancia, circa 25 BC; but in consequence of his cruelty and insolence, the Astures took up arms again in 22.

There is a coin in which Titus Carisius is identified as triumvir monetalis, and another which mentions Publius Carisius, as legatus and propraetor, together with the word Emerita, apparently referring to the town of Augusta Emerita in Lusitania, which the emperor Augustus established for the emeriti, veterans of the war in Hispania.  From this it has been conjectured that the praenomen Titus, assigned to the conqueror of the Astures by Cassius Dio, should instead be Publius.

See also
 List of Roman gentes

Footnotes

Roman gentes